Aok Sokunkanha (Khmer: ឱក សុគន្ធកញ្ញា; born 14 September 1987) is a Cambodian singer, actress, and a brand ambassador. She is known for being a judge and audition committee member for the reality shows The Voice Cambodia, Cambodian Idol The Voice Kid Cambodia and X Factor Cambodia.Aok Sokunkanha is the first female artist to get more than 50 music with more than million views in Cambodia with her record Aok Sokunkanha went to the No.1 Top female singer in Cambodia.

Early life 
Aok Sokunkanha was born on 14 September 1987 in Chamkarmon District, Phnom Penh.  Her father, Aok Boni, was a musician, and her mother, In Sokun, was a teacher and dance instructor at the Royal University of Fine Arts. She has three siblings and she is the eldest child in the family.  After graduating from high school, she also went on to study art at the Royal School of Fine Arts. Sokunkanha started to have a passion for arts at the age of 10. At first, her father never knew she could sing, so one day he was surprised to hear his daughter sang so he got off the wall while teaching other students to sing. From then on, her father would take her with him every time he performed. Her father wrote a song for a dance performance wishing her a happy day in the absence of his band singer. Sokunkanha also had the opportunity to sing in the performance. She and her mother often went to Eav Vathana's house to sing karaoke. Eav Vathana, who later became the producer of Rasmey Stoeng Sangke Production, at that time, Sokunkanha entered the art field during 1999. She joined the first song that was produced by the production.

Career

19992005: Start of music career in (RSK) Production 
Aok Sokunkanha first entered the art world in 1999. The production that she first sang was Steong Sangke Production, which during the years (1999–2004), Reaksmey Steong Sangke Production did not have many songs for her. In 2005, RSK started releasing many songs for her to sing, which included a song that made Sokunkanha began to get noticed and known: (Where Did You Get My Number) RSK Vol.25 2005 And later in 2005, Reaksmey Steong Sangke Production announced its closure. Sokun Kanha also went out to sing at U2 Entertainment Club at night. Started a career at U2 Entertainment Club was led her to know the new production, U2 Entertainment Production in 2006.

20062007: U2 Entertainment Production 
In 2006, Sokunkanha released a series of songs for U2 Production, but did not receive any support. That year, she had many song competitions in various productions.
In 2007, Sokunkanha released a joint album with members of U2 production, including Mr. Khemarak Sereymun, whose song seems to have received a lot of support from young people, which made her very popular in the song "Mae tha" U2 Vol.17 2007 This song is a cover version from the Thai Band Bazoo. In the same year 2007, U2 Entertainment Production announced the closure due to lack of sufficient support, and when Sokunkanha went to Rock Music Production in 2008.

2008: Rock Music Production 
In 2008, Sokunkanha provided a song for the CTN series Snam Sneh Samuth Ream. That same year, Rock Music Production released her song "Khmer National Pride" which was well received by the public. At the end of 2008, Sokunkanha left Rock Production to join Rasmey Hangmeas Production.

2008present: Reaksmey Hang Meas Production

Brand Ambassador

2020present: Chip Mong Land and Chip Mong Bank
In 2020, Aok Sokunkanha signed agreements and has officially become the brand ambassador with Chip Mong Land and Chip Mong Bank, Cambodia.

Achievements

Awards and recognition 

|-
| align="center"| 2010
| align="center"| Top 1 Music Show
| align="center"| imuzik A Award of Music
| 
| align="center"| Metfone imuzik Concert
|
|-
| align="center"| 2012
| align="center"| Top1 Singer Music Billboards  
| align="center"| Top10 Music Billboards By Cool FM
| 
| align="center"| Cool FM Cambodia
|
|-
| align="center"| 2018
| align="center"| Best Female Artist of The Year 
| align="center"| NRG Music Award 
| 
| align="center"| NRG 89FM Cambodia
|

Discography

Live performances
Best of the Best: Live Concert is a concert performed annually
Hang Meas Music Top Show: Live Concert
The Voice Cambodia Tour Concert 2014
Cambodian's Idol Tour Concert 2015
Tour Concert (Tour Concerts are available on special events)

Filmography

Film
 Kmouch Pchea Bat: Supporting role
 Pdey Laor: Lead role
 Coffee Shop Girl – The Star: Main role
 Momeach Proleng Plarng: Supporting role

TV shows 
2014: Judge, The Voice Cambodia Season 1
2015: Judge, Cambodian Idol Season 1
2016: Coach, Cambodian Idol Season 2
2016: Coach, The Voice Cambodia Season 2
2017: Coach, The Voice Kid Cambodia Season 1
2017: Judge, Cambodian Idol Season 3
2018: Coach, The Voice Kid Cambodia Season 2
2019: Judge, The X Factor Cambodia Season 1

References

External links
 

1987 births
Living people
21st-century Cambodian women singers